Armigeres is a genus of mosquito belonging to the family Culicidae.

The species of this genus are found in Southeastern Asia and Northern Australia.

Species:

Armigeres alkatirii 
Armigeres annulipalpis 
Armigeres annulitarsis 
Armigeres apoensis 
Armigeres aureolineatus 
Armigeres azurini 
Armigeres baisasi 
Armigeres balteatus 
Armigeres bhayungi 
Armigeres breinli 
Armigeres candelabrifer 
Armigeres chrysocorporis 
Armigeres cingulata 
Armigeres confusus 
Armigeres conjungens 
Armigeres denbesteni 
Armigeres dentatus 
Armigeres digitatus 
Armigeres dolichocephalus 
Armigeres durhami 
Armigeres ejercitoi 
Armigeres fimbriatus 
Armigeres flavus 
Armigeres foliatus 
Armigeres giveni 
Armigeres hybridus 
Armigeres inchoatus 
Armigeres joloensis 
Armigeres jugraensis 
Armigeres kesseli 
Armigeres kinabaluensis 
Armigeres kuchingensis 
Armigeres lacuum 
Armigeres laoensis 
Armigeres lepidocoxitus 
Armigeres longipalpis 
Armigeres magnus 
Armigeres maiae 
Armigeres malayi 
Armigeres manalangi 
Armigeres maximus 
Armigeres menglaensis 
Armigeres milnensis 
Armigeres moultoni 
Armigeres obturbans 
Armigeres omissus 
Armigeres pallithorax 
Armigeres papuensis 
Armigeres pectinatus 
Armigeres pendulus 
Armigeres sembeli 
Armigeres seticoxitus 
Armigeres setifer 
Armigeres subalbatus 
Armigeres theobaldi 
Armigeres traubi 
Armigeres vimoli 
Armigeres yunnanensis

References

Culicidae